John Desmond Peter (1921–1983) was an English literature scholar, essayist, and novelist born in South Africa. He studied law at the University of South Africa, and English literature at Cambridge University, later obtaining his Ph.D. from Rhodes University.

Peter came to Canada in 1950 and taught English at the University of Manitoba for eleven years. He joined the Victoria College Department of English in 1961. He was co-founder, with Robin Skelton, of the literary magazine Malahat Review.

He is remembered mostly widely for his 1952 essay "A New Interpretation of The Waste Land", in which he interpreted T.S. Eliot's poem as an elegy for a dead (male) friend, Jean Verdenal. At the insistence of Eliot's solicitors, it was suppressed and only republished in 1969, four years after Eliot's death.

Published works

Criticism
 Complaint and Satire in Early English Literature (1956)
 A Critique of "Paradise Lost" (1960)

Novels
 Along That Coast (1964) winner of the Doubleday Canadian Novel Prize
 Take Hands at Winter (1967)
 Runaway (1969)

Short stories
 Vallor (1978)

External links
John Peter fonds at University of Victoria, Special Collections

Canadian male novelists
Rhodes University alumni
1921 births
1983 deaths
20th-century Canadian novelists
20th-century Canadian male writers
South African expatriates in the United Kingdom
Alumni of the University of Cambridge
South African emigrants to Canada